Coominglah is a rural locality in the North Burnett Region, Queensland, Australia. The land use is grazing on native vegetation.

Geography 
The Coominglah Range forms the north-eastern boundary of the locality.

Coominglah has the following mountains:
 Mount Margaret 
 The Knob 

The Burnett Highway enters the locality from the north (Lawgi Dawes) and exits to the east (Coominglah Forest).

The land use is grazing on native vegetation.

History 
Coominglah was one of four pastoral runs selected by Adolphus Henry Trevethan in July 1848 following advice from the Archer brothers.

Coominglah State School opened circa December 1939 with teacher Miss Viola Petra Goodfellow. It closed circa 1947. It was on Burns Road, now within the boundaries of neighbouring Lawgi Dawes.

Education 
There are no schools in Coominglah. The nearest government primary schools are Monto State School in Monto to the south-east and Thangool State School in Thangool to the north-west. The nearest government secondary school is Monto State High School in Monto.

References 

North Burnett Region
Localities in Queensland